Nairn St. Ninian Football Club are a Scottish football club based in Nairn, Highland. Members of the Scottish Junior Football Association, they currently play in the North Super League. Formed in 1968, the club are based at Showfield Park Nairn and their home colours are maroon and sky blue. Their away colours are black and white

Honours
 North Region Division 1 (West):
Winners: 2017–18
Runner Up: 2001–02
 North Division 2:
 Runner Up: 2006–07
North Regional (North) League:
Winners (4): 1975–76, 1977–78, 1978–79, 1981–82
 North East Division 1 West:
 Runner Up: 1997–98
North Region Second Division (Gordon Williamson) Trophy: 1969–70, 1982–83, 1991–92, 1999–00
Gordon Williamson Cup: 2006–07
Morayshire Junior Cup: 1968–69, 1979–80, 1997–98
Matthew Cup: 1997–98
Nicholson Cup: 1979–80, 1980–81, 1982–83, 1997–98
Robbie Nicol Cup: 1988–89, 1995–96
Robertson Cup: 1969–70, 1980–81, 1982–83
Stewart Memorial Cup: 1970–71, 1977–78, 1980–81, 1987–88, 1995–96
Connon Cup: 1973–74, 1974–75, 1986–87, 1987–88
North of Scotland (Morayshire) Cup: 1980–81
White Horse Cup: 1974–75
Elginshire Cup: 2011–12, 2017–18

References

External links
Non-league Scotland

Association football clubs established in 1968
Football clubs in Scotland
Scottish Junior Football Association clubs
Football in Highland (council area)
1968 establishments in Scotland
Nairn